Spokane Community College Transit Center or SCC Transit Center is a transit center and future BRT terminus in the Spokane Transit Authority route system.  It is one of Spokane Transit's four primary transit centers, along with the STA Plaza, West Plains, and Pence-Cole Valley transit centers.

It is located on the southeastern corner of the Spokane Community College campus along Mission Avenue and serves as a transfer point for bus routes serving Spokane Valley, Millwood, North Spokane, and South Spokane.  It will also serve as the eastern terminus for the planned City Line, slated to open in 2023.

History
Planning for the Spokane Community College transit center began around 1982 and the center opened c. 1984.  It was later reconstructed during summer 2013 in a project that replaced all existing shelter structures and added additional bus loading zones.  The 2013 improvements are intended to be an interim solution as the transit center will eventually be replaced by a newer and larger one.

The decision was made to reconstruct the Spokane Community College transit center at a site on the opposite side of campus.  Growing transit operations combined with site constraints, particularly the construction of an elevated North Spokane Corridor adjacent to the current site, limit the future potential of the transit center in its current form.  Construction on the new transit center began in 2019 and was completed in December 2019.

Future
The SCC Transit Center will be the eastern terminus of the currently under-construction City Line bus rapid transit line, slated to begin service in 2023.  Because the vehicles will utilize electric-battery propulsion to be charged through inductive charging, major infrastructure improvements would be required to support the BRT line.

Location
As implied by its name, the transit center is located on the Spokane Community College campus and is sited at its southeast corner.

References

Transit centers in the United States
Transportation in Spokane, Washington
Spokane, Washington
Bus stations in Washington (state)
Transportation buildings and structures in Spokane County, Washington